Sainte-Hélène is a commune in the Morbihan department of Brittany in north-western France. Inhabitants of Sainte-Hélène are called in French Hélénois.

Economy
The area is primarily an agricultural community, but also relies increasingly on the tourist industry, offering a range of 'gîte' accommodation and attracting visitors to the Étel estuary area.

See also
Communes of the Morbihan department

References

External links

 Mayors of Morbihan Association 

Sainthelene